Frank Norgrove (17 July 1878–1948) was an English footballer who played in the Football League for Glossop and Manchester City.

References

1878 births
1948 deaths
English footballers
Association football defenders
English Football League players
Glossop North End A.F.C. players
Manchester City F.C. players